Ochrimnus lineoloides is a species of seed bug in the family Lygaeidae.  It is found in the Caribbean and North America.

References

Further reading

 
 
 

Lygaeidae